The Latin Anthology is a modern name given to a collection of Latin verse, from the age of Ennius to about 1000, formed by Pieter Burmann the Younger. Nothing corresponding to the Greek Anthology is known to have existed among the Romans, though professional epigrammatists like Martial published their volumes on their own account, collections of short sententiae were compiled from authors like Publilius Syrus, and small groups of verse on special subjects, like the Priapeia, also survive. 

The first general collection of scattered pieces made by a modern scholar was Scaliger's Catalecta veterum Poetarum (1573), succeeded by the more ample one of Pithoeus, Epigrammata et Poemata e Codicibus et Lapidibus collecta (1590). Numerous additions, principally from inscriptions, continued to be made, and in 1759–1773 Burmann digested the whole into his Anthologia veterum Latinorum Epigrammatum et Poematum, the editorship of which fell to philologist Johann Christian Wernsdorf after Burmann's death. This, occasionally reprinted, was the standard edition until 1869, when Alexander Riese commenced a new and more critical recension, from which many pieces improperly inserted by Burmann were rejected, and his classification was replaced by an arrangement that followed the sources from which the poems were derived, beginning with those found in manuscripts, followed by those from inscriptions. The first volume (in two parts) first appeared in 1869–1870, with a second edition of the first part in 1894 and a second edition of the second part in 1906. In 1982 the first part was replaced by an entirely new edition by D. R. Shackleton Bailey. The second volume (in two parts) appeared in 1895–1897 under the separate title Carmina Epigraphica and was edited by Franz Bücheler. Having been formed by scholars motivated by no aesthetic principles of selection, but chiefly intent on preserving everything they could find, the Latin anthology is much more heterogeneous than the Greek.

References

External links
 Anthologia latina sive Poesis latinae supplementus, recensuit Franciscus Buecheler et Alexander Riese, vol. 1, parts 1 and 2, vol. 2, parts 1, 2 and 3, Lipsiae in aedibus B. G. Teubneri, 1869-1926.
Frank F. Abbott, "Review of Anthologia Latina. Pars posterior: Carmina Epigrapphica conlegit Franciscus Buecheler. Lipsiae, 1895-97" in The American Journal of Philology, vol. 19, n. 1 (1898), pp. 86–90.